Goeppertia curaraya (syn. Calathea curaraya) is a species of flowering plant in the Marantaceae family. It is native to Ecuador and Colombia. Its natural habitat is subtropical or tropical moist lowland forests.

References

curaraya
Flora of Colombia
Flora of Ecuador
Vulnerable plants
Taxonomy articles created by Polbot
Taxobox binomials not recognized by IUCN